"Nobody Wins" is a song recorded by American country music artist Radney Foster, co-written by himself and Kim Richey. It was released in January 1993 as the second single from his debut album Del Rio, TX 1959. The song is the highest-peaking single of his career, spending 20 weeks on the Billboard Hot Country Singles & Tracks (now Hot Country Songs) charts and peaking at number 2, behind "The Heart Won't Lie" by Reba McEntire and Vince Gill. It also peaked at number 7 on the Canadian RPM country music charts in May 1993. Mary Chapin Carpenter sings background vocals on the song.

Music video
The music video was directed by Sara Nichols and premiered in early 1993.

Charts
"Nobody Wins" debuted at number 56 on the U.S. Billboard Hot Country Singles & Tracks for the week of January 23, 1993.

Year-end charts

References

1993 singles
Radney Foster songs
Songs written by Radney Foster
Songs written by Kim Richey
Arista Nashville singles
1992 songs